Alexandra Elizabeth Jackson (born 10 June 1952) is a British former competitive swimmer.

Swimming career
She won a bronze medal in the women's 100-metre freestyle at the 1970 European Aquatics Championships.  She competed for Great Britain at the 1968 Summer Olympics in Mexico City, in the 100- and 200-metre freestyle, and the 4×100-metre freestyle and 4×100-metre medley relay events; her best achievement were sixth places in the 100-metre freestyle and 4×100-metre medley relay. In the medley relay she competed with Margaret Auton, Wendy Burrell and Dorothy Harrison.

She is a four times winner of the British Championship in 100 metres freestyle (1967-1970) and the 200 metres freestyle in 1968.

References

1952 births
Living people
European Aquatics Championships medalists in swimming
British female freestyle swimmers
Irish female swimmers
Olympic swimmers of Great Britain
Swimmers at the 1968 Summer Olympics
British female swimmers
Commonwealth Games medallists in swimming
Commonwealth Games bronze medallists for the Isle of Man
Swimmers at the 1970 British Commonwealth Games
Medallists at the 1970 British Commonwealth Games